Tanika-Jazz Noble-Bell (born 20 February 1996) is a New Zealand rugby league footballer who played for the New Zealand Warriors in the NRL Women's Premiership.

Background
Born in Auckland, Noble-Bell played basketball until she was 17 before switching to rugby league.

Playing career
In 2018, while playing for the Manurewa Marlins, Noble-Bell was named in the New Zealand train-on squad. 

On 1 August 2018, she was announced as a member of the New Zealand Warriors NRL Women's Premiership team. In Round 1 of the 2018 NRL Women's season, she made her debut for the Warriors in a 10–4 win over the Sydney Roosters.

On 22 February 2020, she represented the Māori All Stars in their 4–10 loss to the Indigenous All Stars.

References

External links
NRL profile

1996 births
Living people
New Zealand people of Māori descent
New Zealand Māori rugby league players
New Zealand female rugby league players
Rugby league props
New Zealand Warriors (NRLW) players